The Finnish film industry produced over thirty feature films in 2014. This article fully lists all non-pornographic films, including short films, that had a release date in that year and which were at least partly made by Finland. It does not include films first released in previous years that had release dates in 2014.  Also included is an overview of the major events in Finnish film, including film festivals and awards ceremonies, as well as lists of those films that have been particularly well received, both critically and financially.

Major Releases

See also
 2014 in film
 2014 in Finland
 Cinema of Finland
 List of Finnish submissions for the Academy Award for Best Foreign Language Film

References

External links

Finnish
Films
2014